Dicranoweisia is a genus of mosses belonging to the family Rhabdoweisiaceae.

The genus has cosmopolitan distribution.

There are 34 accepted species, including:
 Dicranoweisia brevipes
 Dicranoweisia crispula

References

Dicranales
Moss genera